was a Japanese female volleyball player, who played as a middle blocker.

She was part of the Japan women's national volleyball team at the 2002 FIVB Volleyball Women's World Championship in Germany. On club level she played with Takefuji Bamboo and later for NEC Red Rockets.

Clubs
 Takefuji Bamboo (2002)
 NEC Red Rockets (-2012)

References

External links
profile at ntv.co.jp

1980 births
2019 deaths
Japanese women's volleyball players
Sportspeople from Yamanashi Prefecture